Fatehpora also known as Fateh Pora & Fatehpura, is an economic hub area of Anantnag district in the union territory of Jammu and Kashmir, India. It has an average elevation of 1600 metres (5478 feet) above mean sea level.

Demographics
As per the 2011 India Census, Fatehpora had a population of 6,737, with males constituting 51% of the population and females, 49%. Fatehpora had an average literacy rate of 60%, higher than the national average of 59.5%. The male literacy was 67%, and female literacy was 53%. In Fatehpora, 17% of the population was under 6 years of age. Nearly all of the persons living in Fatehpora are Sunni Muslims.

Geography
Fatehpora is constituted of main area like Babadar, Khan Pora, Kabamarg, Gund Fatehpora & Kuchipora.
There are several larger streams such as Brengi. Another stream Lidar joins the river a little downstream and from that point the river becomes navigable.

Transport

By Rail
Sadura Railway Station & Anantnag Railway Station are the closest railway stations for Fatehpora. However, ever Jammu Tawi Railway Station is major railway station 243 km near to Fatehpora.

Education

Colleges
Govt. Polytechnic College, Larkipora

Schools
 Baba Naseeb-u-Din Gazi Memorial Public School, Fatehpora
 Government Higher Secondary School, Kabamarg (Fatehpora)
 Government Middle School, Fatehpora
 Government Middle School (Girls), Fatehpora

See also
Anantnag

References

External links

Villages in Anantnag district
Ancient Indian cities
Kashmir
Anantnag district